Brennan Eagles (born October 24, 1998) is an American football wide receiver who is currently a free agent. He played college football at Texas.

Early life and education
Eagles was born in Baton Rouge, Louisiana, and grew up in Houston, Texas. He attended Alief Taylor High School, and was a five-star recruit to college. He committed to the University of Texas at Austin, where he played in eleven games as a freshman, making one catch for 35 yards. As a sophomore, Eagles started seven times and appeared in twelve games, recording 32 receptions for 522 yards and scoring six touchdowns. In his junior year, he appeared in all nine games and started seven, leading the team with 28 catches for 469 yards and five touchdowns. He chose to forgo his senior season and declare for the National Football League Draft.

Eagles finished his career with 32 games played, 15 starts, and 61 catches for 1,026 receiving yards and 11 touchdown catches.

Professional career

Dallas Cowboys
After going unselected in the 2021 NFL Draft, Eagles was signed by the Dallas Cowboys as an undrafted free agent. He was released on August 17. He later had a tryout with the Green Bay Packers.

Philadelphia Stars
Eagles was selected in the 15th round of the 2022 USFL Draft by the Philadelphia Stars. On April 16, 2022, he was transferred to the team's practice squad and remained on the inactive roster on April 22. He was a backup wide receiver and did not record any stat.

References

Further reading

Living people
Players of American football from Texas
Players of American football from Louisiana
American football wide receivers
Texas Longhorns football players
Dallas Cowboys players
Philadelphia Stars (2022) players
1998 births